Delegated Path Discovery (DPD) is a method for querying a trusted server for information about a public key certificate.

DPD allows clients to obtain collated certificate information from a trusted DPD server. This information may then be used by the client to validate the subject certificate.

The requirements for DPD are described in RFC 3379.

See also 
 Delegated Path Validation
 SCVP

Cryptographic protocols